Romello Desmond Camar Nangle (born 8 January 1995) is an English footballer.

Career
Born in Nottingham, England, Nangle started a two-year scholarship in 2011 with Notts County, scoring nine goals in his debut season for the youth side. He made his professional debut on 1 September 2012, in a 2–0 victory over Bury in League One, replacing Lee Hughes as a substitute.

Career statistics

A.  The "Other" column constitutes appearances (including substitutes) and goals in the Football League Trophy.

References

External links

1995 births
Living people
Footballers from Nottingham
English footballers
Association football forwards
Notts County F.C. players
English Football League players
Newark F.C. players